The Royal College of Music is a conservatoire established by royal charter in 1882, located in South Kensington, London, UK. It offers training from the undergraduate to the doctoral level in all aspects of Western Music including performance, composition, conducting, music theory and history. The RCM also undertakes research, with particular strengths in performance practice and performance science. The college is one of the four conservatories of the Associated Board of the Royal Schools of Music and a member of Conservatoires UK. Its buildings are directly opposite the Royal Albert Hall on Prince Consort Road, next to Imperial College and among the museums and cultural centres of Albertopolis.

History

Background
The college was founded in 1883 to replace the short-lived and unsuccessful National Training School for Music (NTSM). The school was the result of an earlier proposal by the Prince Consort to provide free musical training to winners of scholarships under a nationwide scheme. After many years' delay it was established in 1876, with Arthur Sullivan as its principal. Conservatoires to train young students for a musical career had been set up in major European cities, but in London the long-established Royal Academy of Music had not supplied suitable training for professional musicians: in 1870 it was estimated that fewer than ten per cent of instrumentalists in London orchestras had studied at the academy. The NTSM's aim, summarised in its founding charter, was: 

The school was housed in a new building in Kensington Gore, opposite the west side of the Royal Albert Hall.  The building was not large, having only 18 practice rooms and no concert hall.  In a 2005 study of the NTSM and its replacement by the RCM, David Wright observes that the building is "more suggestive of a young ladies' finishing school than a place for the serious training of professional musicians".

Under Sullivan, a reluctant and ineffectual principal, the NTSM failed to provide a satisfactory alternative to the Royal Academy and, by 1880, a  committee of examiners comprising Charles Hallé, Sir Julius Benedict, Sir Michael Costa, Henry Leslie and Otto Goldschmidt reported that the school lacked "executive cohesion". The following year Sullivan resigned and was replaced by John Stainer. In his 2005 study of the NTSM, Wright comments:

Even before the 1880 report, it had become clear that the NTSM would not fulfil the role of national music conservatoire. As early as 13 July 1878, a meeting was held at Marlborough House, London under the presidency of the Prince of Wales, "for the purpose of taking into consideration the advancement of the art of music and establishing a college of music on a permanent and more extended basis than that of any existing institution". The original plan was to merge the Royal Academy of Music and the National Training School of Music into a single, enhanced organisation.  The NTSM agreed, but after prolonged negotiations, the Royal Academy refused to enter into the proposed scheme.

In 1881, with George Grove as a leading instigator and with the support of the Prince of Wales, a draft charter was drawn up for a successor body to the NTSM. The Royal College of Music occupied the premises previously home to the NTSM and opened there on 7 May 1883.  Grove was appointed its first director. There were 50 scholars elected by competition and 42 fee-paying students.

Early years
Grove, a close friend of Sullivan, loyally maintained that the new college was a natural evolution from the NTSM. In reality, his aims were radically different from Sullivan's. In his determination that the new institution should succeed as a training ground for orchestral players, Grove had two principal allies: the violinist Henry Holmes and the composer and conductor Charles Villiers Stanford. They believed that a capable college orchestra would not only benefit instrumental students, but would give students of composition the essential chance to experience the sound of their music. The college's first intake of scholarship students included 28 who studied an orchestral instrument. The potential strength of the college orchestra, including fee-paying instrumental students, was 33 violins, five violas, six cellos, one double bass, one flute, one oboe and two horns. Grove appointed 12 professors of orchestral instruments, in addition to distinguished teachers in other musical disciplines including Jenny Lind (singing), Hubert Parry (composition), Ernst Pauer (piano), Arabella Goddard (piano) and Walter Parratt (organ).

The old premises proved restrictive and a new building was commissioned in the early 1890s on a new site in Prince Consort Road, South Kensington. The building was designed by Sir Arthur Blomfield in Flemish Mannerist style in red brick dressed with buff-coloured Welden stone. Construction began in 1892 and the building opened in May 1894. The building was largely paid for by two large donations from Samson Fox, a Yorkshire industrialist, whose statue, along with that of the Prince of Wales, stands in the entrance hall.

Grove retired at the end of 1894 and was succeeded as director by Hubert Parry.

Later history
Parry died in 1918 and was succeeded as director by Sir Hugh Allen (1919–37), Sir George Dyson (1938–52), Sir Ernest Bullock (1953–59), Sir Keith Falkner (1960–74), Sir David Willcocks (1974–84), Michael Gough Matthews(1985–93) and  Dame Janet Ritterman (1993–2005). The College's current Director is Professor Colin Lawson whose tenure began in July 2005.

The College's teaching professoriate numbers over 200 musicians, including internationally known figures like Dmitri Alexeev, Chen Jiafeng, Natalie Clein, Danny Driver, Martin Gatt, Jakob Lindberg, Patricia Rozario, Ashley Solomon, Mark-Anthony Turnage, Roger Vignoles, Raphael Wallfisch and Errollyn Wallen as well as principals of the major London orchestras including the London Symphony, BBC Symphony, London Philharmonic, Philharmonia and the Royal Philharmonic Orchestras.

Since its founding in 1882, the college has been linked with the British royal family. Its patron was Queen Elizabeth II. For 40 years Queen Elizabeth The Queen Mother was president; in 1993 Charles III (then Prince of Wales) became president.

A hall of residence serving 170 students was opened in 1994 in Goldhawk Road, Shepherd's Bush.

The college is a registered charity under English law.

Curriculum
The college teaches all aspects of Western classical music from undergraduate to doctoral level. There is a junior department, where 300 children aged 8 to 18 are educated on Saturdays.

Partnership
Since August 2011, RCM has been collaborating with Nanyang Academy of Fine Arts, Singapore, and now offers both undergraduate and taught postgraduate degree programmes, jointly conferred by both institutions.

Performance venues
The RCM's main concert venue is the Amaryllis Fleming Concert Hall: a 468-seat barrel-vaulted concert hall designed by Blomfield, built in 1901 and extensively restored in 2008–09. The Britten Theatre, which seats 400, was opened by Queen Elizabeth II in 1986 and is used for opera, ballet, music and theatre. There is also a 150-seat recital hall dating from 1965, as well as several smaller recital rooms, including three organ-equipped Parry Rooms.

Royal College of Music Collections

Owing partly to the vision of its founders, particularly Grove, the RCM now holds significant Collection Materials, dating from the fifteenth century onwards. These include autograph manuscripts such as Haydn's String Quartet Op. 64/1, Mozart's Piano Concerto K491 and Elgar's Cello Concerto. More extensive collections feature the music of Herbert Howells, Frank Bridge and Malcolm Arnold and film scores by Stanley Myers. Among more than 300 original portraits are John Cawse's 1826 painting of Weber (the last of the composer), Haydn by Thomas Hardy (1791) and Bartolommeo Nazari's painting of Farinelli at the height of his fame. A recent addition to the collection is a portrait of the Russian composer Alfred Schnittke by Reginald Gray. 10,000 prints and photographs constitute the most substantial archive of images of musicians in the UK. The RCM's 600,000 concert programmes document concert life from 1730 to the present day. There are also more than 800 musical instruments and accessories from circa 1480 to the present. Amongst instruments housed in the refurbished Museum is a clavicytherium, thought to be the world's oldest surviving keyboard instrument. As well as instruments, the Museum's displays include portraits, sculptures, photographs and engravings related to music. Admission is free.

Alumni and faculty

Since opening in 1882, the college has had a distinguished list of teachers and alumni, including most of the composers who brought about the "English Musical Renaissance" of the 19th and 20th centuries. Students in the time of Stanford and Parry included Samuel Coleridge-Taylor, Gustav Holst, Ralph Vaughan Williams and John Ireland.  Later alumni include Benjamin Britten, Michael Tippett, Malinee Peris, Colin Davis, Olga Jegunova, Vasco Dantas, Gwyneth Jones, Rowland Lee, Neville Marriner, Hugh McLean, Gervase de Peyer, Trevor Pinnock, Anna Russell, Andrew Lloyd Webber, Julian Lloyd Webber, David Helfgott, James Horner, Jacob Mühlrad, Isyana Sarasvati, Sir Reginald Thatcher, Gillian Weir, and the guitarist John Williams.

Directors of the RCM
Sir George Grove (1882)
Sir Hubert Parry (1895)
Sir Hugh Allen (1918)
Sir George Dyson (1938)
Sir Ernest Bullock (1953)
Sir Keith Falkner (1960)
Sir David Willcocks (1974)
Michael Gough Matthews (1985)
Dame Janet Ritterman (1993)
Colin Lawson (since 2005)

Awards 
Awards include ARCM (Associate), LRCM (Licentiate) and FRCM (Fellow).

Each year the Royal College of Music bestows a number of honorary degrees, memberships and fellowships on individuals who have made an exceptional contribution to life at the RCM and the wider musical community.

See also
 List of music museums

References

External links
Official website
Official YouTube channel
Virtual tour of the Royal College of Music provided by Google Arts & Culture

 
Royal colleges
Music schools in London
Higher education colleges in London
Performing arts education in London
Educational institutions established in 1882
Charities based in London
Museums in the City of Westminster
Music museums in London
1882 establishments in England
Arthur Blomfield buildings
Education in the City of Westminster
Universities UK